

Friedrich "Fritz" Warnecke (25 November 1898 – 4 May 1968) was a German general (Generalmajor) in the Wehrmacht during World War II. He was a recipient of the Knight's Cross of the Iron Cross of Nazi Germany.

Awards and decorations 

 Knight's Cross of the Iron Cross on 22 January 1943 as Major and commander of the III./Grenadier-Regiment 517

References

Citations

Bibliography

 
 

1898 births
1968 deaths
Major generals of the German Army (Wehrmacht)
German Army personnel of World War I
Recipients of the clasp to the Iron Cross, 1st class
Recipients of the Gold German Cross
Recipients of the Knight's Cross of the Iron Cross
German prisoners of war in World War II
People from Hanover Region
Military personnel from Lower Saxony
German Army generals of World War II